The 2019–20 Botswana Premier League was the 55th season of the Botswana Premier League, the top-tier football league in Botswana, since its establishment in 1966. The season started on 31 August 2019.

It was abandoned by the Botswana Football Association due to the COVID-19 pandemic in Botswana. The table at the time was considered final) and Jwaneng Galaxy declared champions

League table

Stadiums

References

Botswana Premier League
Botswana
2019 in Botswana sport
2020 in Botswana sport